Domitia is the name of women from the gens Domitia of Ancient Rome. Women from the gens include:

 Domitia (aunt of Messalina), aunt of Roman emperor Nero and empress Messalina
 Domitia Lepida, mother of Roman empress Valeria Messalina
 Domitia Longina (c. 54–128), wife of Roman Emperor Domitian
 Domitia Decidiana (1st century), wife of Roman General Gnaeus Julius Agricola and mother-in-law to historian Tacitus
 Domitia Calvilla or Domitia Lucilla Minor (died c. 158), mother of Roman Emperor Marcus Aurelius
 Domitia Paulina (died c. 85), mother of Roman Emperor Hadrian
 Aelia Domitia Paulina (75–130), sister of Roman Emperor Hadrian
 Domitia Faustina, short-lived daughter of Roman Emperor Marcus Aurelius and Roman Empress Faustina the Younger
 Saint Domitia, a saint of Orthodox Christianity

See also
 Ahenobarbus

Domitii
Ancient Roman prosopographical lists of women